The 1926 William & Mary Indians football team represented the College of William & Mary as an independent during the 1926  college football season. Led by fourth-year head coach J. Wilder Tasker, the Indians compiled a record of 7–3.

Schedule

References

William and Mary
William & Mary Tribe football seasons
William